Tudun Wada may refer to several local government areas in Nigeria: 

 Tudun Wada (Kano state)
 Tudun Wada (Kuduna State)
 A residential area in Jos North
 A district south of Zaria